Bruz ( or ) is a commune in the Ille-et-Vilaine department in Brittany in northwestern France.

Geography 
Bruz is located near the center of the  Ille-et-Vilaine department, 14 km from Rennes. It is near the confluence of the rivers Vilaine and Seiche.

Population
Inhabitants of Bruz are called  in French.

Mayors

The current mayor is Philippe Salmon, elected in 2020. Previous mayors are:
 Auguste Louapre (Miscellaneous Right), from 2014 to 2020;
 Philippe Caffin (Miscellaneous Left), from 2008 to 2014;
 Robert Barré (Union for French Democracy), from 1989 to 2008;
 Alphonse Legault (Miscellaneous Right), from 1960 to 1989.

Several streets and places are named after previous mayors : François Joly (from 1919 to 1944), Joseph Jan.

The mairie (City hall) is right in the centre of the town.

Breton language 
In 2008, 3.76% of children attended bilingual primary schools. The municipality signed the Ya d'ar brezhoneg charter on 1 October 2011.

The Breton name of the commune is also Bruz.

See also
 Communes of the Ille-et-Vilaine department
 The works of Jean Fréour Sculptor of work in Bruz church
Bruz houses 2e régiment du matériel (2nd RMAT).

References

External links

 Official website 
 
Mayors of Ille-et-Vilaine Association 

Communes of Ille-et-Vilaine